Pablo Bruna (22 June 1611 – 27 June 1679) was a Spanish composer and organist notable for his blindness (caused by a childhood bout of smallpox), which resulted in his being known as "El ciego de Daroca" ("the blind man of Daroca"). It is not known how Bruna received his musical training, but in 1631 he was appointed organist of the collegiate church of St. María in his hometown of Daroca, later rising to choirmaster in 1674. He remained there until his death in 1679.

Thirty-two of Bruna's organ works have survived, mostly in the tiento form.  Many, known as tientos de medio registro, are for divided keyboard, a typical feature of Spanish organs. Bruna was known as a capable teacher and his nephew Diego Xaraba, whom he taught, also became a prominent musician.

References

External links

 Pablo Bruna, at Cancioneros Musicales Españoles.

Spanish Baroque composers
1611 births
1679 deaths
Blind classical musicians
Spanish blind people
Spanish male classical composers
Spanish classical organists
Male classical organists
17th-century classical composers
17th-century male musicians